Guy A. Richard,  (born June 1932) is a former lawyer and former Chief Justice of the Queen's Bench of New Brunswick from 1982 to 1994.

Personal life
Richard was born in Sainte-Anne-de-Kent, the son of André F. Richard, who served as a MLA.

Career
He was a lawyer in Bouctouche from 1958 to 1971.

In 1971, he was appointed a Judge of the Provincial Court of New Brunswick, serving in the Northwestern area. In 1976, he was appointed a Judge of the Court of Queen's Bench. In 1979, he was appointed a Justice of the New Brunswick Court of Appeal.

In 1982, Mr. Richard was named Chief Justice of the Court of Queen's Bench of New Brunswick and served the people of his province in that role until his retirement in 1994.

Post-retirement, he continued to serve as an adjudicator, notably as mediator in the strike between Canada Post Corporation and the Canadian Union of Postal Workers in 1998.

In 2001, he led a committee on the future of the Université de Moncton, helping the university set its future course as a comprehensive, francophone institution of higher learning and research. In 2003, he served with fellow Order of New Brunswick inductee Roger Augustine as mediator during the dispute between non-Aboriginal and Aboriginal fishers at Burnt Church. In 2004, Mr. Richard was appointed Chair of the Federal Electoral Boundaries Commission of New Brunswick and officially retired from judicial duties in the summer of 2007.

Recognition and awards
In 1987, the Université de Moncton offered him an honorary doctorate degree.

Personal life
He is married to Germaine Theriault. They had 5 children, Andre G. Richard Q.C., Chief Justice Jolene Richard, Denis Richard, Martine Richard, and Dr. Carole Richard.

References

Citations

Sources 

 http://www.tc.gc.ca/medias/communiques/nat/1996/96_h042f.htm
 https://web.archive.org/web/20110706181715/http://www16.rhdcc-hrsdc.gc.ca/labour/newsrele/9772_e.html-ssi
 https://web.archive.org/web/20100602083426/http://an.capacadie.com/actualites-regionales/2010/5/30/guy-a-richard-honore

Judges in New Brunswick
Living people
Members of the Order of New Brunswick
Canadian King's Counsel
1932 births